The Fondazione Querini Stampalia is a cultural institution in Venice, Italy, founded in 1869 at the behest of the last descendant of the Venetian Querini Stampalia family, Conte Giovanni Querini (Count John Querini). Architect Carlo Scarpa designed interior, exterior, and garden elements and spaces on the ground floor of the historic building.

Location

The foundation is located in the Palazzo Querini Stampalia and includes living quarters, an archive, a library, and a museum of paintings and furnishings, the Pinacoteca Querini Stampalia. Located just South of the Church of Santa Maria Formosa in the sestiere Castello, the Foundation is open to the public for academic research.

Collections

The museum has a substantial art collection, specially of masterpieces of Venetian Baroque and Rococo, including paintings by Giovanni Bellini (Presentation at the Temple), Pietro Longhi, Giandomenico Tiepolo, Giulio Carpioni, Federico Cervelli, Matteo Ghidoni, Pietro and Alessandro Longhi, Pietro Muttoni, (also called della Vecchia), and Marco and Sebastiano Ricci among others. Particularly prized are the arcadian landscapes, genre scenes, and Longhi's series on the Seven Sacraments.

The museum also hosts some more modern works, including from the donation of the post-impressionist Venetian artist Eugenio Da Venezia. As well as a collection of artworks, Da Venezia gave funds to be used to build a collection of twentieth-century art representing Venice. There is also a collection of books and papers donated by the Venetian poet, Mario Stefani.

Access
The Biblioteca della Fondazione Querini Stampalia, the Foundation Library, is open even on Sundays, the only one of its kind in the city, from 10 AM to 7 PM. It is considered to be one of the most beautiful public libraries in the city. Count Giovanni, in his testament in 1868, wished to ensure that the Library was open even when other libraries in the city were closed.

References

External links
Official  Fondazione Querini Stampalia website

Libraries in Venice
Museums in Venice
Art museums and galleries in Venice
Art museums established in 1869
Libraries established in 1869
1869 establishments in Italy